The Rural Municipality of Hillsburg is a former rural municipality (RM) in the Canadian province of Manitoba. It was originally incorporated as a rural municipality on November 19, 1912. It ceased on January 1, 2015 as a result of its provincially mandated amalgamation with the RM of Shell River and the Town of Roblin to form the Municipality of Hillsburg – Roblin – Shell River.

The Valley River 63A Indian reserve lied on its east side. About 30 percent of the former RM lied within Duck Mountain Provincial Forest.

Communities 
 Bield
 Merridale
 Shevlin
 Shortdale

References 

 Manitoba Historical Society - Manitoba Municipalities: Rural Municipality of Hillsburg
 Map of Hillsburg R.M. at Statcan
 Geographic Names of Manitoba (pg. 112) - the Millennium Bureau of Canada

Hillsburg
Populated places disestablished in 2015
2015 disestablishments in Manitoba